"
Pulchrana signata, commonly known as the variable-backed frog, striped stream frog, spotted stream frog, or Matang frog, is a species of "true frog" (family Ranidae). It is native to the Malay Peninsula (Thailand and Peninsular Malaysia), Sumatra and Natuna Archipelago (Indonesia), and Borneo (Malaysia, Brunei Darussalam, Indonesia). It is not currently considered threatened by the IUCN.

References

External links
 Sound recordings of Pulchrana signata at BioAcoustica

signata
Amphibians of Brunei
Amphibians of Indonesia
Amphibians of Malaysia
Amphibians of Thailand
Amphibians of Borneo
Fauna of Sumatra
Amphibians described in 1872
Taxa named by Albert Günther